Harriet Edquist  is an Australian curator, and Professor of Architectural History in the School of Architecture and Design at RMIT University in Melbourne. Born and educated in Melbourne, she has both published widely on and created numerous exhibitions in the field of Australian (in particular, Victorian) architecture, art and design history. She also contributes to the production of Australian architectural knowledge as editor of the RMIT Design Archives Journal and is a member of the Design Research Institute at RMIT University.

Education 
Edquist graduated from St Catherine's School, Toorak in 1965. She then studied for a Bachelor of Arts and Master of Arts in Classics (1976) from Monash University, and completed a PhD in Architectural History at RMIT University (2000).

Academic career 
Edquist began her teaching career as a lecturer in the Department of Fine Arts, University of Melbourne, and specialised in Renaissance and modern art history.

In 1987, she joined RMIT University as editor (with Karen Burns) of Transition: Discourse on Architecture; a quarterly magazine produced by the Department of Architecture from 1979 until 2000 and dedicated to discourse on contemporary architectural practice and theory. Serving from 1987 to 1991, the partnership of Edquist and Karen Burns stretched the critical range of this publication, arguing - as they wrote in their editorial for Transition 38 - that architectural discourse could extend "the boundaries of discussion to include all the arts and observations on the society". They were both subsequently replaced as editors of Transition following a controversial 're-setting' of the publication's agenda, which was played out publicly through editorials and letters.

In 1988, Edquist was appointed lecturer in Architectural History by RMIT University and from 2001 to 2007 served as Head of the School of Architecture and Design. She now holds the position of Professor of Architectural History at RMIT University. She was previously director of the RMIT Design Archives and is the editor of the RMIT Design Archives Journal.

She is currently a member (and was the past President from 2003 to 2005) of SAHANZ, the Society of Architectural Historians Australia and New Zealand. Professor Edquist is also a member of Docomomo Australia.

In June 2015, she became the Foundation President of Automotive Historians Australia. This new organisation focusses on Australian automative history and was launched alongside Shifting Gear: Design, Innovation and the Australian car, an exhibition curated by Edquist in conjunction with David Hurlston.

Curated exhibitions 
2015 Shifting Gear: Design, Innovation and the Australian car, NGV Federation Square - with David Hurlston
2014 Free, Secular and Democratic: building the Public Library 1853–1913, State Library of Victoria
2013 Frederick Romberg: An Architectural Survey, RMIT Design Archives - with Michael Spooner, Keith Deverell, and Stephen Banham
2012 The Lost Modernist. Michael O'Connell, Bendigo Art Gallery - with Tansy Curtin
2012 A skilled hand and cultivated mind: a guide to the architecture and art of RMIT University - with Elizabeth Grierson
2010-11 The Stony Rises Project, touring exhibition RMIT Gallery and regional Victorian galleries - with Laurene Vaughan and Lisa Byrne
2010 The architecture of Neil Clerehan - with Richard Black
2002 Kurt Popper, Jewish Museum of Australia
2001 Ernest Fooks, Jewish Museum of Australia - with Helen Stuckey
2001 Frederick Romberg. An Architecture of Migration 1938-1975, RMIT Gallery and the University of Queensland Gallery - with Helen Stuckey
1999 Wolfgang Sievers & Stanhill, RMIT Gallery - with Vanessa Bird
1992 The Angelic Space. A Celebration of Piero della Francesca's 500th Anniversary, Monash University Gallery - with Juliana Engberg
1991 George Baldessin. An Exhibition of Drawings, Heide Museum of Modern Art
1991 Diologhi per una possibile Utopia, Museo Civico Cuneo, Piedmont and Turin Politecnico, Italy - with Karen Burns and Mauro Baracco
1991 Companion City, ACCA  (Australian Centre of Contemporary Art) - with Karen Burns
1989 Robin Boyd: The Architect as Critic, State Library of Victoria - with Karen Burns and Dean Cass

Selected recent publications * 
2014 'Architecture and design' In: Encyclopedia of Women and Leadership in Twentieth Century, Australian Women's Archives Project 2014, Australia
2013 'Frederick Romberg (1913-1992): an architectural survey' In: Frederick Romberg. An Architecture of Migration 1938-1975, Melbourne, Australia - with Spooner, M., Deverell, K., Banham, S., Ashton, K., and Tsolakis, L.
2013 Building a new world: a history of the state library of Victoria 1853-1913, State Library of Victoria, Melbourne, Australia
2013 '"An architecture to excite an interest": grand visions for Melbourne's public library' In: The La Trobe Journal, 52 - 61
2013 'The architectural legacy of the Scots in the western district of Victoria, Australia' In: Architectural Heritage, 24, 67 - 85
2011 Michael O'Connell: The Lost Modernist, Melbourne Books, Melbourne, Australia
2010 Designing Place: An Archaeology of the Western District, Melbourne Books, Melbourne Australia - with Lisa Byrne and Laurene Vaughan
2008 Pioneers of Modernism. The Arts and Crafts Movement in Australia, Miegunyah Press, Melbourne Australia
2004 Harold Desbrowe-Annear: a life in architecture, Miegunyah Press, Melbourne, Australia

Awards and honours 
In 1992, Edquist was awarded the Bates Smart National Award for Architecture in the Media, for her work editing Transition: Discourse on Architecture. Edquist also shared this role with fellow architecture academic Karen Burns.

In 2004, she was also awarded a Bates Smart National Award for Architecture in the Media, for her work writing the book Harold Desbrowe-Annear: A Life in Architecture.

Edquist was awarded an Honorary Fellow at the Australian Institute of Architects in 2006, for services to architectural education and history. She is also an Honours Committee chair of the Victorian Chapter of the Australian Institute of Architects.

She is a member of the International Confederation of Architectural Museums, and a founding member of its Australian counterpart, icam Australia.

In 2016 Edquist was elected a Fellow of the Australian Academy of the Humanities (FAHA).

Edquist was appointed a Member of the Order of Australia (AM) in the 2020 Australia Day Honours for "significant service to architectural history and design, and to higher education".

References 

Australian architecture writers
Australian women academics
Australian women architects
Australian architectural historians
Writers from Melbourne
Architecture educators
Australian feminists
Living people
1940s births
Australian women historians
Fellows of the Australian Academy of the Humanities
20th-century Australian women writers
20th-century Australian historians
Members of the Order of Australia
Academic staff of RMIT University
RMIT University alumni
Monash University alumni
Academics from Melbourne
People educated at St Catherine's School, Melbourne